Moshe Teitelbaum may refer to:

 Moshe Teitelbaum (Ujhel) (1759–1841), Hasidic Rebbe
 Moshe Teitelbaum (Satmar) (1914–2006), Hasidic Rebbe